Catherine Bainbridge is a Canadian director, writer, and producer. She co-found Rezolution Pictures, a Montreal-based film and television production company focusing primarily on Canadian Aboriginal productions, with director/writer/producer Ernest Webb in 2001.

Bainbridge and Alfonso Maiorana wrote and directed Rumble: The Indians Who Rocked the World to highlight the role of Indigenous artists in American music history.

Filmography

References

External links 
 

Living people
Canadian women film directors
Canadian women film producers
Canadian women screenwriters
Year of birth missing (living people)
Directors of Genie and Canadian Screen Award winners for Best Documentary Film
Canadian women documentary filmmakers